Luck of the Draw may refer to:

 Luck of the Draw (album), by Bonnie Raitt
 Luck of the Draw (board game), a drawing game
 "Luck of the Draw" (Sliders), an episode of the TV show Sliders
 "Luck of the Draw", an episode of ER
 The Gambler Returns: The Luck of the Draw, a 1991 TV movie
 Luck of the Draw (novel), by Piers Anthony
 Luck of the Draw (film), a 2000 film featuring Andy Milder